Aung Moe Nyo, a doctor, is a Burmese politician who served as Chief Minister of Magway Region, the head of the Magway Region Government, from 2016 to 2021. He was elected from NLD in the former elections and re-elected in the 2015 election and became the chief minister in 2016.

Early life and education 
Aung Moe Nyo graduated from Rangoon Institute of Medicine in 1982 and started his own clinic in 1984.

Political career 
He won a seat in the 1990 election, capturing 74 percent of the vote. He was one of the NLD MPs-elect who were arrested in 1998 and kept without trial in military prisons referred to as “guesthouses”. He was released in 2001 and was elected as a lower house MP in the 2012 by-election.

He was re-elected in 2015 for Pwintbyu Township. He has promised to prioritise resolving land-grab cases. He became chief minister of Magway region in 2016. 

In the wake of the 2021 Myanmar coup d'état on 1 February, Aung Moe Nyo was detained by the Myanmar Armed Forces. As of October 2021, authorities had charged Aung Moe Nyo with corruption, bribery, and incitement.

References 

Living people
National League for Democracy politicians
Government ministers of Myanmar
Prisoners and detainees of Myanmar
University of Medicine 1, Yangon alumni
Year of birth missing (living people)